was a Japanese film director.

Biography
Masumura was born in Kōfu, Yamanashi. After dropping out of a law course at the University of Tokyo he worked as an assistant director at the Daiei Film studio, later returning to university to study philosophy; he graduated in 1949. He then won a scholarship allowing him to study film in Italy at the Centro Sperimentale di Cinematografia under Michelangelo Antonioni, Federico Fellini and Luchino Visconti.

Masumura returned to Japan in 1953. From 1955, he worked as a second-unit director on films directed by Kenji Mizoguchi, Kon Ichikawa and Daisuke Ito, before directing his own first film, Kisses, in 1957. Over the next three decades, he directed 58 films in a variety of genres.

Legacy
Japanese film critic Shigehiko Hasumi said, "Young and influential filmmaker Shinji Aoyama declared that Masumura is the most important filmmaker in the history of postwar Japanese cinema."

Filmography

References

External links
 
 

1924 births
1986 deaths
People from Kōfu, Yamanashi
Japanese film directors
Centro Sperimentale di Cinematografia alumni
University of Tokyo alumni